Little Crumb is a 1999 Dutch film directed by Maria Peters, based on the novel by Chris van Abkoude. It was the most popular Dutch film of the year and in the top 20 most popular Dutch films of all time. It was the Netherlands' submission to the 73rd Academy Awards for the Academy Award for Best Foreign Language Film, but was not accepted as a nominee.

Cast
Ruud Feltkamp as Kruimeltje
Hugo Haenen as Wilkes, Harry's best friend
Rick Engelkes as Harry Folker, Kruimeltje's father
Thekla Reuten as Lize van Dien, Kruimeltje's mother	
Yannick van de Velde as Keesie, Kruimeltje's friend 	
Sacha Bulthuis as Mrs Koster
Ingeborg Uyt den Boogaard 	as Vera di Borboni, maid
Jaap Maarleveld as old neighbour
Joop Doderer as Koster 	
Bert Geurkink as policeman
Jan Decleir as Father Keyzer

Sequel 
In February 2020, a second film by Kruimeltje was released:  Kruimeltje en de strijd om de goudmijn.

See also

Cinema of the Netherlands
List of submissions to the 73rd Academy Awards for Best Foreign Language Film
18th Ale Kino! Festival

References

External links

1999 films
1999 drama films
1990s Dutch-language films
Dutch children's films
Dutch drama films
Films based on Dutch novels
Films set in the 1920s